Cambell Crawford Nalder (20 December 1937 – 14 March 1987) was an Australian politician who served as a National Party member of the Legislative Assembly of Western Australia from 1986 to 1987, representing the seat of Narrogin.

The son of Crawford Nalder, who later served as the state's Deputy Premier, Nalder was born in Wagin, a small town in the Great Southern region of Western Australia. Like his father, he went on to board at Wesley College, Perth, graduating in 1954. Nalder was elected to parliament at the 1986 state election, but died of cancer in March 1987, aged 49, having served just over a year. His death necessitated a by-election, which was won by National Party candidate Bob Wiese. Nalder's son, Dean Nalder, was elected as the Liberal Party member for Alfred Cove and later member for Bateman, while his niece, Karen Middleton, is the chief political correspondent for The Saturday Paper.

References

1937 births
1987 deaths
Australian people of English descent
Deaths from cancer in Western Australia
Members of the Western Australian Legislative Assembly
People educated at Wesley College, Perth
People from Wagin, Western Australia
National Party of Australia members of the Parliament of Western Australia
20th-century Australian politicians